Drăgănești-Olt is a town in Olt County, Muntenia, Romania. The first document mentioning it is from 1526. Drăgănești-Olt became a town in 1968. The town administers one village, Comani.

Geography
The town is situated on the Wallachian Plain.

The town is crossed by county road DJ546, which meets national road DN6 a few miles to the south. The Drăgănești-Olt train station serves the CFR Line 900, which runs from Bucharest,  to the east, to Timișoara and the border with Serbia to the west.

Natives
 Cosmin Achim
 
 Daniel Oprița
 Constantin Tobescu

References

Towns in Romania
Populated places in Olt County
Localities in Muntenia